Blasto may refer to:

Blastomycosis, a fungal disease
Captain Blasto, a character from Rugrats
Blasto (arcade game)
Blasto (video game), a third-person-shooter on PlayStation